"You Beat Me to the Punch" is a soul single by Motown singer Mary Wells, released on the Motown label in 1962. It was co-written by Smokey Robinson of the Miracles, who was responsible for the majority of hits released by Wells - and another Miracles member, Ronnie White - while Wells was a Motown artist.

Following the success of the previous single, "The One Who Really Loves You", Motown released "You Beat Me to the Punch" shortly after it was produced and it performed similarly to "The One Who Really Loves You", becoming a Billboard Top 10 Pop smash, peaking at number nine on the pop chart and becoming her first number one hit on the Billboard R&B singles chart. It also won Wells a Grammy nomination for Best Rhythm and Blues Recording.

Like "The One Who Really Loves You" before it, the song was produced with a mock-calypso beat.
It inspired an  "answer" song by soul singer Gene Chandler called "You Threw A Lucky Punch" which used the same music and different lyrics and became a Pop and R&B chart hit that year.

Personnel
Lead vocal by Mary Wells
Background vocals by the Love Tones (Carl Jones, Joe Miles, and Stan Bracely)
Written and produced by Smokey Robinson and Ronnie White
Instrumentation by The Funk Brothers

Trivia
In DTV, "You Threw A Lucky Punch" was set to Toby Tortoise Returns. 
This song was used in the movie Boulevard Nights.

References 

1962 singles
Mary Wells songs
Motown singles
Songs written by Smokey Robinson
Songs written by Ronald White
Song recordings produced by Smokey Robinson
1962 songs